The 1896 United States presidential election in Tennessee took place on November 3, 1896. All contemporary 45 states were part of the 1896 United States presidential election. Tennessee voters chose 12 electors to the Electoral College, which selected the president and vice president.

Background
For over a century after the Civil War, Tennessee’s white citizenry was divided according to partisan loyalties established in that war. Unionist regions covering almost all of East Tennessee, Kentucky Pennyroyal-allied Macon County, and the five West Tennessee Highland Rim counties of Carroll, Henderson, McNairy, Hardin and Wayne voted Republican – generally by landslide margins – as they saw the Democratic Party as the “war party” who had forced them into a war they did not wish to fight. Contrariwise, the rest of Middle and West Tennessee who had supported and driven the state’s secession was equally fiercely Democratic as it associated the Republicans with Reconstruction. After the state’s white landowning class re-established its rule in the early 1870s, black and Unionist white combined to forge adequate support for the GOP to produce a competitive political system for two decades, although during this era the Republicans could only capture statewide offices when the Democratic Party was divided on this issue of payment of state debt.

White Democrats in West Tennessee were always aiming to eliminate black political influence, which they first attempted to do by election fraud in the middle 1880s and did so much more successfully at the end of that decade by instituting in counties with significant black populations a secret ballot that prevented illiterates voting, and a poll tax throughout the state, which cut turnout by at least a third in the 1890s. This poll tax was supposedly relaxed or paid by party officials in Unionist Republican areas, where whites were much poorer than in secessionist areas.

The mid-1890s Populist movement did not affect Tennessee so much as other southern states, with the party never cracking 12 percent in any biennial gubernatorial election.

Vote
Although the state’s poll tax had already reduced the Republican black and poor white electorate, Democratic managers were unsure about carrying Tennessee in late October, because it was felt that urban businessmen would desert the party in sufficient numbers for McKinley to come close to carrying the state. Polls the day before the election suggested Tennessee would be exceedingly close, but as it turned out Bryan would carry the state relatively easily by around six points, which was still a decline upon recent Democratic performances despite a quantitatively reduced Republican electorate.

Results

Results by county

Notes

References

Tennessee
1896
1896 Tennessee elections